Azorella albovaginata is a species of flowering plant in the genus Azorella found in northwest and south Argentina. Azorella albovaginata var. pauciflorum is a variety of the species and is found in central Chile

External links
 Azorella albovaginata.
 Azorella albovaginata var. pauciflorum.

fuegiana
Flora of Chile